The Domino gas field natural gas field is located on the continental shelf of the Black Sea. It was discovered in 2012 and developed by Petrom and ExxonMobil. It will begin production in 2020 and will produce natural gas and condensates. The total proven reserves of the Domino gas field are between 1.46 trillion cubic feet (42 km³) and 2.92 trillion cubic feet (84 km³), and production is slated to be around 630 million cubic feet/day (17.8×106m³) in 2020.

References

Natural gas fields in Romania
Black Sea energy